Blanca Vischer (January 5, 1915 – November 24, 1969) was a Guatemalan film actress who moved to the United States where she made most of her films. Vischer generally played supporting or minor roles, but occasionally played more prominent characters particularly in Spanish-language films made by American studios such as The Tango on Broadway (1934) in which she was third billed. Vischer also appeared in several Mexican films. In 1936, she featured in the Hollywood war film A Message to Garcia (1936).

Selected filmography
 The Tango on Broadway (1934)
 Wild Gold (1934)
 Under the Pampas Moon (1935)
 The Bohemian Girl (1936)
 The Devil on Horseback (1936)
 A Message to Garcia (1936)
 You and Me (1938)
 The Black Beast (1939)
 Another Thin Man (1939)
 Billy the Kid's Gun Justice (1940)
 Cookoo Cavaliers (1940)
Fury of the Congo (1951)

References

Bibliography 
 Wilson, Victoria. A Life of Barbara Stanwyck: Steel-True 1907-1940. Simon and Schuster, 2013.

External links 
 

1915 births
1969 deaths
Guatemalan film actresses
People from Quetzaltenango
20th-century Guatemalan actresses